Diego Schweizer (born 19 July 1938) is an Argentine alpine skier. He competed in two events at the 1960 Winter Olympics.

References

1938 births
Living people
Argentine male alpine skiers
Olympic alpine skiers of Argentina
Alpine skiers at the 1960 Winter Olympics
Skiers from Buenos Aires